John Welles (by 1485 – 1515/18), of New Windsor, Berkshire, was an English Member of Parliament.

He was a Member (MP) of the Parliament of England for New Windsor in 1510, 1512 and 1515. Little is known of his life, but no children were mentioned in his will.

References

15th-century births
1510s deaths
Members of the Parliament of England (pre-1707) for New Windsor
English MPs 1510
English MPs 1512–1514
English MPs 1515